Baphomet is a deity allegedly worshipped by the Knights Templar that subsequently became incorporated into various occult and Western esoteric traditions. The name Baphomet appeared in trial transcripts for the Inquisition of the Knights Templar starting in 1307. It first came into popular English usage in the 19th century during debate and speculation on the reasons for the suppression of the Templar order. Baphomet is a symbol of balance in various occult and mystical traditions, the origin of which some occultists have attempted to link with the Gnostics and Templars, although occasionally purported to be a deity or a demon. Since 1856 the name Baphomet has been associated with the "Sabbatic Goat" image drawn by Éliphas Lévi, composed of binary elements representing the "symbolization of the equilibrium of opposites": half-human and half-animal, male and female, good and evil, etc. Lévi's intention was to symbolize his concept of balance, with Baphomet representing the goal of perfect social order.

History 

The name Baphomet appeared in July 1098 in a letter about the siege of Antioch by the French Crusader Anselm of Ribemont:

Raymond of Aguilers, a chronicler of the First Crusade, reports that the troubadours used the term Bafomet for Muhammad, and Bafumaria for a mosque. The name Bafometz later appeared around 1195 in the Provençal poems  by the troubadour Gavaudan.

Baphomet was allegedly worshipped as a deity by the medieval order of the Knights Templar. King Philip IV of France had many French Templars simultaneously arrested, and then tortured into confessions in October 1307. [source] The name Baphomet appeared in trial transcripts for the Inquisition of the Knights Templar that same year. Over 100 different charges had been leveled against the Templars, including heresy, homosexual relations, spitting and urinating on the cross, and sodomy. Most of them were dubious, as they were the same charges that were leveled against the Cathars and many of King Philip's enemies; he had earlier kidnapped Pope Boniface VIII and charged him with nearly identical offenses. Yet Malcolm Barber observes that historians "find it difficult to accept that an affair of such enormity rests upon total fabrication". The "Chinon Parchment suggests that the Templars did indeed spit on the cross", says Sean Martin, and that these acts were intended to simulate the kind of humiliation and torture that a Crusader might be subjected to if captured by the Saracens, where they were taught how to commit apostasy "with the mind only and not with the heart". Similarly, Michael Haag suggests that the simulated worship of Baphomet did indeed form part of a Templar initiation rite.

The name Baphomet comes up in several of these dubious confessions. Peter Partner states in his 1987 book The Knights Templar and their Myth: "In the trial of the Templars one of their main charges was their supposed worship of a heathen idol-head known as a Baphomet (Baphomet = Mahomet)." The description of the object changed from confession to confession; some Templars denied any knowledge of it, while others, who confessed under torture, described it as being either a severed head, a cat, or a head with three faces. The Templars did possess several silver-gilt heads as reliquaries, including one marked capud m, another said to be St. Euphemia, and possibly the actual head of Hugues de Payens. The claims of an idol named Baphomet were unique to the Inquisition of the Templars. Karen Ralls, author of the Knights Templar Encyclopedia, argues that it is significant that "no specific evidence [of Baphomet] appears in either the Templar Rule or in other medieval period Templar documents."

The name Baphomet came into popular English usage in the 19th century during debate and speculation on the reasons for the suppression of the Templars. Modern scholars agree that the name of Baphomet was an Old French corruption of the name "Mohammed", with the interpretation being that some of the Templars, through their long military occupation of the Outremer, had begun incorporating Islamic ideas into their belief system, and that this was seen and documented by the Inquisitors as heresy. Alain Demurger, however, rejects the idea that the Templars could have adopted the doctrines of their enemies. Helen Nicholson writes that the charges were essentially "manipulative"—the Templars "were accused of becoming fairy-tale Muslims". Medieval Christians believed that Muslims were idolatrous and worshipped Muhammad as a god, with mahomet becoming mammet in English, meaning an idol or false god (see also Medieval Christian views on Muhammad). This idol-worship is attributed to Muslims in several . For example, one finds the gods Bafum e Travagan in a Provençal poem on the life of St. Honorat, completed in 1300. In the Chanson de Simon Pouille, written before 1235, a Saracen idol is called Bafumetz.

Alternative etymologies
While modern scholars and the Oxford English Dictionary state that the origin of the name Baphomet was a probable Old French version of "Mahomet", alternative etymologies have also been proposed.

The androgynous nature of the figure apparently goes back to the Adam Kadmon of the Chaldeans, which one finds in the Zohar" (pages 164–165).

In the 18th century, speculative theories arose that sought to tie the Knights Templar with the origins of Freemasonry. Nicolai "attached to it the idea of the image of the supreme God, in the state of quietude attributed to him by the Manichaean Gnostics", according to F. J. M. Raynouard, and "supposed that the Templars had a secret doctrine and initiations of several grades", which "the Saracens had communicated ... to them". He further connected the figura Baffometi with the Pythagorean pentacle:

His source is the "Abbé Constant", which is to say, Alphonse-Louis Constant, the real name of Eliphas Levi.

Hugh J. Schonfield (1901–1988), one of the scholars who worked on the Dead Sea Scrolls, argued in his book The Essene Odyssey that the word "Baphomet" was created with knowledge of the Atbash substitution cipher, which substitutes the first letter of the Hebrew alphabet for the last, the second for the second last, and so on. This theory is an important part of the plot of the novel The Da Vinci Code.

Joseph Freiherr von Hammer-Purgstall

In 1818, the name Baphomet appeared in the essay by the Viennese Orientalist Joseph Freiherr von Hammer-Purgstall,  ("Discovery of the Mystery of Baphomet, by which the Knights Templars, like the Gnostics and Ophites, are convicted of Apostasy, of Idolatry and of moral Impurity, by their own Monuments"), which presented an elaborate pseudohistory constructed to discredit Templarist Masonry and, by extension, Freemasonry. Following Nicolai, he argued, using as archaeological evidence "Baphomets" faked by earlier scholars and literary evidence such as the Grail romances, that the Templars were Gnostics and the "Templars' head" was a Gnostic idol called Baphomet.

Charles William King criticized Hammer, saying that he had been deceived by "the paraphernalia of ... Rosicrucian or alchemical quacks", and Peter Partner agreed that the images "may have been forgeries from the occultist workshops". At the very least, there was little evidence to tie them to the Knights Templar—in the 19th century some European museums acquired such pseudo-Egyptian objects, which were cataloged as "Baphomets" and credulously thought to have been idols of the Templars.

Éliphas Lévi

Later in the 19th century, the name of Baphomet became further associated with the occult. Éliphas Lévi published  ("Dogma and Rituals of High Magic") as two volumes ( 1854,  1856), in which he included an image he had drawn himself, which he described as Baphomet and "The Sabbatic Goat", showing a winged humanoid goat with a pair of breasts and a torch on its head between its horns (see the illustration). This image has become the best-known representation of Baphomet. Lévi considered the Baphomet to be a depiction of the absolute in symbolic form and explicated in detail his symbolism in the drawing that served as the frontispiece:

Witches' Sabbath
Lévi's depiction of Baphomet is similar to that of The Devil in the early Tarot. Lévi, working with correspondences different from those later used by S. L. MacGregor Mathers, "equated the Devil Tarot key with Mercury", giving "his figure Mercury's caduceus, rising like a phallus from his groin".

Lévi believed that the alleged devil worship of the medieval Witches' Sabbath was a perpetuation of ancient pagan rites.

Lévi's Baphomet, for all its modern fame, does not match the historical descriptions from the Templar trials, although it was likely inspired by the "Baphomet" figures depicted in Hammer-Purgstall's Mysterium Baphometis revelatum. It may also have been partly inspired by grotesque carvings on the Templar churches of Lanleff in Brittany and Saint-Merri in Paris, which depict squatting bearded men with bat wings, female breasts, horns and the shaggy hindquarters of a beast.

Socialism, romanticism, and magnetism
Lévi's references to the School of Alexandria and the Templars can be explained against the background of debates about the origins and character of true Christianity. It has been pointed out that these debates included contemporary forms of Romantic socialism, or Utopian socialism, which were seen as the heirs of the Gnostics, Templars, and other mystics. Lévi, being himself an adherent of these schools since the 1840s, regarded the socialists and Romantics (such as Lamartine) as the successors of this alleged tradition of true religion. Consequently, the Baphomet is depicted by Lévi as the symbol of a revolutionary heretical tradition that would soon lead to the "emancipation of humanity" and the establishment of a perfect social order.

In Lévi's writings, the Baphomet does not only express a historical-political tradition, but also occult natural forces that are explained by his magical theory of the Astral Light. He developed this notion in the context of what has been called "spiritualist magnetism": theories that stressed the religious implications of magnetism. Often, their representatives were socialists that believed in the social consequences of a "synthesis" of religion and science that was to be achieved by the means of magnetism. Spiritualist magnetists with a socialist background include the Baron du Potet and Henri Delaage, who served as main sources for Lévi. At the same time, Lévi polemicized against famed Catholic authors such as Jules-Eudes de Mirville and Roger Gougenot des Mousseaux, who regarded magnetism as the workings of demons and other infernal powers. The paragraph just before the passage cited in the previous section has to be seen against this background:

Goat of Mendes

Mendes in the Greek name for the ancient Egyptian city of Djedet. Lévi equates his image with "The Goat of Mendes", possibly following the account by Herodotus that the god of Mendes was depicted with a goat's face and legs. Herodotus relates how all male goats were held in great reverence by the Mendesians, and how in his time a woman publicly copulated with a goat. E. A. Wallis Budge writes:

The link between Baphomet and the pagan god Pan was also observed by Aleister Crowley as well as Anton LaVey:

Aleister Crowley

The Baphomet of Lévi was to become an important figure within the cosmology of Thelema, the mystical system established by Aleister Crowley in the early 20th century. Baphomet features in the Creed of the Gnostic Catholic Church recited by the congregation in The Gnostic Mass, in the sentence: "And I believe in the Serpent and the Lion, Mystery of Mysteries, in His name BAPHOMET."

In Magick (Book 4), Crowley asserted that Baphomet was a divine androgyne and "the hieroglyph of arcane perfection", seen as that which reflects: "What occurs above so reflects below, or As above so below".

For Crowley, Baphomet is further a representative of the spiritual nature of the spermatozoa, while also being symbolic of the "magical child" produced as a result of sex magic. As such, Baphomet represents the Union of Opposites, especially as mystically personified in Chaos and Babalon combined and biologically manifested with the sperm and egg united in the zygote.

Crowley proposed that Baphomet was derived from "Father Mithras". In his Confessions he describes the circumstances that led to this etymology:

Modern interpretations and usage

Lévi's Baphomet is the source of the later tarot image of the Devil in the Rider–Waite design. The concept of a downward-pointing pentagram on its forehead was enlarged upon by Lévi in his discussion (without illustration) of the Goat of Mendes arranged within such a pentagram, which he contrasted with the microcosmic man arranged within a similar but upright pentagram. The actual image of a goat in a downward-pointing pentagram first appeared in the 1897 book , written by the French occultist Stanislas de Guaita. It was this image that was later adopted as the official symbol—called the Sigil of Baphomet—of the Church of Satan, and continues to be used among Satanists.

Baphomet, as Lévi's illustration suggests, has occasionally been portrayed as a synonym of Satan or a demon, a member of the hierarchy of Hell. Baphomet appears in that guise as a character in James Blish's The Day After Judgment. Christian evangelist Jack T. Chick claimed that Baphomet is a demon worshipped by Freemasons, a claim that apparently originated with the Taxil hoax.

In 2014, The Satanic Temple commissioned an  statue of Baphomet to stand alongside a monument of the Ten Commandments at the Oklahoma State Capitol, citing "respect for diversity and religious minorities" as reasons for the monument. (The Oklahoma Supreme Court ultimately declared religious displays illegal.) The Baphomet statue was unveiled in Detroit on 25 July 2015, as a symbol of the modern Satanist movement. The Satanic Temple transported the Baphomet statue to Little Rock, Arkansas, where another 10 Commandments monument had been recently installed; the statue was publicly displayed during a Temple demonstration on 16 August 2018.

Baphomet appears in Dungeons & Dragons as a powerful demon lord and is also known as the "Horned King", or the "Prince of Beasts". Baphomet is followed by minotaurs and other savage creatures. He desires the end of civilizations so all creatures may embrace their most basic, brutal instincts. He is described as a massive, black minotaur, with blood around his mouth and red eyes. He wears an iron crown topped with the heads of his enemies, along with spiked armor. He wields a huge glaive, named "Heartcleaver", but commonly fights with his hooves, claws, and horns. He rules of the 600th layer of The Abyss, known as the "Endless Maze", and is the sworn enemy of Yeenoghu, another demon lord.

In Sartor Resartus (1833–4) by Thomas Carlyle, protagonist Diogenes Teufelsdröckh describes his spiritual rebirth as a "Baphometic Fire-baptism". Clive Barker's novel Cabal (1988) and its film adaption, Nightbreed (1990), Baphomet is depicted as the god worshipped by the Night Breed creatures.

Baphomet also serves as the main antagonist in the PC game Tristania 3D and is the worshipped deity of the evil Courbée Dominate society. The game's storyline describes in depth that in fact Philip IV of France was the one who had worshipped Baphomet, not the Knights Templar, and he deliberately eradicated the entire order to make sure that this secret would remain undiscovered. In the last level, the protagonist must enter the afterlife to seek out and defeat Baphomet, however, he is protected by the shadows of his fallen worshippers in the previous levels, along with the ghost of Evil Empress and the protagonist's former accomplice, Evil Twirl. The game depicts Baphomet very close to the original, except that it has a male torso and dragon-like wings, as opposed to feathered ones. Baphomet's main attack is a lethal wall of fire, which causes severe damage and can be manifested in rapid successions. Baphomet also can turn himself invisible during his attack periods. Successfully defeating him will win the game, albeit it is noted that defeating him does not mean that he is killed.

An interpretation of Baphomet, referred to as The Sword of Baphomet, forms part of the main plot in the 1996 point-and-click adventure game Broken Sword: The Shadow of the Templars developed by Revolution Software. It is the first game in the Broken Sword series. The player assumes the role of George Stobbart, an American tourist in Paris, as he attempts to unravel a conspiracy, much of which is influenced by and includes factual and fictional references and narrative devices relating to the history of the Knights Templar.

In the 2005 puzzle-Metroidvania La-Mulana and its 2012 remake, Baphomet appears as the boss of the Twin Labyrinths.

In July 2015, YouTube star and singer Poppy depicted the deity in the music video for her single "Lowlife". Poppy can be seen imitating the famous pose of Baphomet.

The 2016 audio drama Robin of Sherwood: The Knights Of The Apocalypse (based on the TV show Robin of Sherwood), has Robin and his companions come into conflict with the titular Knights. The Knights of the Apocalypse are depicted as a cult which worships Baphomet; the Knights are also depicted as a splinter group from the Knights Templar.

The 2018 Netflix series Chilling Adventures of Sabrina has a large statue of Baphomet displayed at the Academy of Unseen Arts. The Satanic Temple has accused the show of plagiarizing their depiction of Baphomet, though later settled out of court.

In Doom Patrol, "Baphomet" is the name of a supernatural oracle who can be summoned by Willoughby Kipling a member of the Knights Templar.  Having no fixed form, she can assume what-ever form she fancies, currently using the form of "Falada", a magical horse from the fairytale, "The Goose Girl".

In the 2019 video game Devil May Cry 5, a type of demonic enemy is also called Baphomet. The entity resembles a floating humanoid creature with goat like features which attacks remotely by casting spells, launching ranged attacks at the player.

See also
 Azazel
 Beelzebub
 Behemoth
 History of the Knights Templar
 Knights Templar legends
 Abraxas in Knights Templar iconography
 Left-hand path and right-hand path
 Mahound
 Medieval Christian views on Muhammad
 Pazuzu
 Termagant

Notes

References

 
 
 
 
 
 
 
 
 
 
 
 
 
 
 
 
 
 
 
 
 
 
 
 
 
  (Previously titled The Murdered Magicians.)

External links

 The True (Lack of) Meaning of Baphomet Satanic Bay Area
  
 

Androgynous and hermaphroditic deities
Demons in Christianity
Fakelore
Horned deities
Individual goats
Islam in fiction
Knights Templar
Left-Hand Path
Magic symbols
Muhammad
Mythological caprids
Mythological human hybrids
New religious movement deities
Satanism
Tarotology
Thelema